Mihály Bíró (27 September 1919 in Budapest - June 1970) was a Hungarian football forward who was a member of the Hungary national team at the 1938 FIFA World Cup. However, he was never capped for the national team. He also played for Ferencvárosi TC. His nickname was "Dani".

References

External links
FIFA profile

Hungarian footballers
1938 FIFA World Cup players
Association football forwards
1919 births
1970 deaths
Ferencvárosi TC footballers
Footballers from Budapest